Maliek Howell (born 27 January 1999) is a Jamaican footballer who plays as a right-back and is currently studying at the University of Memphis.

Early life 

Howell played for Jamaica College in Kingston, Jamaica. He attends the University of Memphis in Tennessee, USA.

Club career 

He has featured for the NY Red Bull U23 team.

International career 
Howell has played at the u20 and senior level for Jamaica.

Career statistics

Club

Notes

International

References

External links
 Maliek Howell at the University of New Mexico
 Maliek Howell at the University of Memphis

1999 births
Living people
Sportspeople from Kingston, Jamaica
University of New Mexico alumni
University of Memphis alumni
Jamaican footballers
Jamaica under-20 international footballers
Jamaica international footballers
Association football defenders
USL League Two players
Harbour View F.C. players
New Mexico Lobos men's soccer players
Memphis Tigers men's soccer players
New York Red Bulls U-23 players
Jamaican expatriate footballers
Jamaican expatriate sportspeople in the United States
Expatriate soccer players in the United States